The fourteenth season of the American reality television series titled Food Network Star premiered on June 10, 2018 on Food Network. Food Network chefs Bobby Flay and Giada de Laurentiis returned as judges.

Contestants

Winners
Christian Petroni - Port Chester, New York
Jess Tom - Princeton, New Jersey

Runner-up
Manny Washington - Orlando, Florida

Eliminated

Jason Goldstein - New York, New York
Chris Valdes - Miami, Florida
Samone Lett - Sanford, Florida
Rebekah Lingenfelser - Savannah, Georgia
Adam Gertler - Los Angeles, California
Harrison Bader - Los Angeles, California
Jess Tom - Princeton, New Jersey (returned to the competition after winning Star Salvation)
Katie Dixon - Hattiesburg, Mississippi
Palak Patel - New York, New York
Amy Pottinger - Honolulu, Hawaii

Contestant progress 

: Manny was eliminated midway through the finale.

 (WINNER) The contestant won the competition and thus became the next Food Network Star.
 (RUNNER-UP) The contestant made it to the finale, but did not win.
 (HIGH) The contestant was one of the selection committee's favorites for that week.
 (IN) The contestant performed well enough to move on to the next week.  
 (LOW) The contestant was one of the selection committee's least favorites for that week, but was not eliminated.
 (OUT) The contestant was the selection committee's least favorite for that week, and was eliminated.

Comeback Kitchen

Contestants 

 Trace Barnett, Season 13
Adam Gertler, Season 4
 Debbie Lee, Season 5
 Yaku Moton-Spruill, Season 12
 Sarah Penrod, Season 10
 Amy Pottinger, Season 13
 Monterey Salka, Season 12
 Jernard Wells, Season 12

Contestant progress

Star Salvation 
This season of Star Salvation is hosted by Alex Guarnaschelli.

Contestant progress

Notes 

1. Debbie was eliminated after the mentor challenge.
2. Yaku was eliminated after the mentor challenge.
3. Sarah and Jernard were eliminated after the star challenge.
4. Adam did not participate in Star Salvation.

References

2018 American television seasons
14